The Saint Nicholas Greek Orthodox Church is an Eastern Orthodox church building located in the grounds of the headquarters of the Greek Community in Prado neighbourhood in Montevideo, Uruguay.

This church is a social and religious meeting point for the Greek Uruguayan community. It is part of the Greek Orthodox Archdiocese of Buenos Aires and South America.

See also
 Greek Orthodox Church
 Greeks in Uruguay

References

External links

 Saint Nicholas Greek Orthodox Church at Facebook

Church buildings in Montevideo

Greek Orthodox churches
Eastern Orthodox church buildings in Uruguay
Greek immigration to Uruguay
European-Uruguayan culture
Prado, Montevideo